FIW may refer to:
 Fiwaga language
 The Future Is Wild, a British documentary miniseries
 Wiesloch Feldbahn and Industrial Museum, 
 Family interference with work; see Work–family conflict
 Feature Interaction Workshops; see Feature interaction problem § Workshops and conferences